FC Futura (abbreviated Futura) is a football club from Porvoo in Finland.  The club was formed in 1992 and their home ground is at the Porvoon keskuskenttä.  The other venue used by the club is the Porvoon Pallokenttä.  The men's first team currently plays in the Kakkonen (Second Division).  The Chairman of FC Futura is Matti Valasti.

Background

FC Futura was established in 1992 and is now recognised as Porvoo's largest football club. Founder Members of the Club's Committee include Alvari Ari Juha, Markku Kemppainen and Vesa Hautala.

The club has played three seasons in the Kakkonen (Second Division), the third tier of Finnish football in 2002–03 and 2009 to date.

FC Futura is strongly focused on the activities of junior club players, with 90% of members coming from the youth section of the club.

Season to season

Club structure

FC Futura run a number of teams including 3 men's teams, 1 ladies team, 11 boys team and 7 girls teams. The club also runs an Academy the name of which has recently been changed from Futura Academy to the Itä-Uudenmaan Akatemia (IUA).  This reflects the fact that the Academy players represent several different clubs.

2010 season

FC Futura Men's Team are competing in Group A (Lohko A) of the Kakkonen administered by the Football Association of Finland  (Suomen Palloliitto) .  This is the third highest tier in the Finnish football system.  In 2009 FC Futura finished in sixth position in their Kakkonen section.

FC Futura / 2 are participating in Section 6 (Lohko 6) of the Kutonen administered by the Uusimaa SPL.

Futura A are a new team participating in Section 5 (Lohko 5) of the Kutonen administered by the Uusimaa SPL.

References and sources
Official website
Finnish Wikipedia
 Suomen Cup

Footnotes

Football clubs in Finland
Sport in Porvoo
Association football clubs established in 1992
1992 establishments in Finland